Katrina Marie Keenan (born 24 February 1971) is a New Zealand former cricketer who played as a right-arm medium-fast bowler. She appeared in 5 Test matches and 54 One Day Internationals for New Zealand between 1995 and 2000. Her final WODI appearance was in the final of the 2000 Women's Cricket World Cup. She played domestic cricket for Canterbury. She coached Japan at the 2010 Asian Games.

Keenan was a contestant on season 4 of The Great Kiwi Bake Off, and was the first baker eliminated from the show.

References

External links

1971 births
Living people
Cricketers from Christchurch
New Zealand women cricketers
New Zealand women Test cricketers
New Zealand women One Day International cricketers
New Zealand cricket coaches
Canterbury Magicians cricketers
Participants in New Zealand reality television series